Eric Christian Ndjie (born February 8, 1988 in Yaoundé) is a professional Cameroonian footballer currently playing for Cotonsport Garoua.

Trivia 
He came in 2006 from Mbalmayo F.C. to Cotonsport Garoua.

External links
Profile and Pictures - www.cotonsport.com

1988 births
Living people
Cameroonian footballers
Coton Sport FC de Garoua players
Association football midfielders